Holy Trinity Cathedral is the seat of the Church of Pakistan, Diocese of Karachi, situated on Fatima Jinnah Road, near Zainab Market, in Karachi, Pakistan.

History
 Established in 1844 and built in 1855, the Holy Trinity Church located on Fatima Jinnah Road, Karachi, is one of the first major churches built in the area. Designed by the Captain of the Bombay Engineers, John Hill, the church had a nave stretching 115 feet, followed by a tower standing at 150 feet tall. The church was built with buff colored Gizri stone and the architectural design made it unique. The church followed a Romanesque layout which made it stand out compared to the buildings located around. At the top of the tower, since there were no lighthouses, it was given beacons to help ships in the Karachi Harbour. In 1904, Captain John Hill and Chief Engineer John Brunton, reviewed the cathedral and found that the foundation was showing signs of weakness and removed the top two stories, giving the tower a new height of 115 feet. During World War I, the churches tower was used as a signaling station, and soon in 1970 the pitched roof from the original design was replaced with barrel vaulted roof. Since the church is a former garrison church for the British military, it was designed to accommodate 800 worshipers and memorialize British servicemen who died in various campaigns and their history.

References

External links 

 Church of Pakistan
 Circa-1890 photos of Trinity church at Sindhisaan.com
 Trinity Church, Karachi at the British Archives

Churches in Karachi
Karachi
Heritage sites in Karachi
Church of Pakistan cathedrals in Pakistan